Datura arenicola is a species of flowering plant in the nightshade family Solanaceae.

References

Solanaceae
arenicola